Cyril James Touff (March 4, 1927 in Chicago – January 24, 2003 in Evanston, Illinois) was a jazz bass trumpeter. He was one of the few jazz musicians known as a bass trumpeter. He was also associated with West coast jazz although he spent most of his life in Chicago.

He started on piano aged six and played xylophone and saxophone before settling on trumpet. He served in the United States Army from 1944 to 1946, and in the military he played trombone. After the war, he switched to bass trumpet and worked with Woody Herman and Sandy Mosse. He joined Herman's band in 1953 and in 1954-55 played with a reduced version of the band that also included Richie Kamuca. He and Mosse led the Pieces of Eight octet in the late 1950s.

Discography
 Cy Touff, His Octet & Quintet (Pacific Jazz, 1955)
 Doorway to Dixie (Argo, 1956)
 Touff Assignment (Argo, 1959)

References

External links
[ All Music]

1927 births
2003 deaths
Jazz musicians from Illinois
Musicians from Chicago
20th-century American male musicians
20th-century American musicians
20th-century trumpeters
American jazz trumpeters
American male trumpeters
Cool jazz trumpeters
American male jazz musicians